Konstantin Vladimirovich Pavlyuchenko (born 11 January 1971) is a former Kazakhstani professional footballer who also holds Ukrainian citizenship.

Club career
He made his professional debut in the Soviet Second League in 1989 for FC Khimik Dzhambul.

Honours
 Ukrainian Premier League runner-up: 1993.

References

1971 births
People from Taraz
Living people
Soviet footballers
Kazakhstani footballers
Kazakhstan international footballers
Kazakhstani expatriate footballers
Russian Premier League players
Ukrainian Premier League players
FC Taraz players
FC Kairat players
FC Dnipro players
FC Lada-Tolyatti players
FC Tekstilshchik Kamyshin players
FC Kryvbas Kryvyi Rih players
Navbahor Namangan players
MFC Mykolaiv players
FC Elektrometalurh-NZF Nikopol players
FC Zorya Luhansk players
FC Nyva Ternopil players
Expatriate footballers in Ukraine
Kazakhstani expatriate sportspeople in Ukraine
Association football forwards
Association football midfielders